ADP-ribosylation factor-related protein 1 is a protein that in humans is encoded by the ARFRP1 gene.

Function 

The protein encoded by this gene is a membrane-associated GTP-ase and localizes to the plasma membrane.  It is related to the ADP-ribosylation factor (ARF) and ARF-like (ARL) genes. The gene is located in a gene cluster that includes the a gene (M68) that is overexpressed in some tumors.

Interactions 

ARFRP1 has been shown to interact with PSCD1.

References

Further reading

External links